was a  after Hōei and before Kyōhō. This period spanned the years from April 1711 through June 1716.

Change of Era
 1711 : The era name of Shōtoku (meaning "Righteous Virtue") was created to mark the enthronement of Emperor Nakamikado. The previous era ended and the new one commenced in Hōei 8, on the 25th day of the 4th month.

Events of the Shōtoku Era
 1711 (Shōtoku 1): An ambassador from Korea arrived at the court.
 November 12, 1712 (Shōtoku 2, 14th day of the 10th month): Shōgun Tokugawa Ienobu died.
 1713 (Shōtoku 3): Minamoto no Ietsugu became the 7th shōgun of the Edo bakufu.
 1714 (Shōtoku 4): The shogunate introduces new gold and silver coins into circulation.
 April 20, 1715 (Shōtoku 5, 17th day of the 3rd month): The 100th anniversary of the death of Tokugawa Ieyasu (posthumously known as Gongen-sama), which was celebrated throughout the empire.

Notes

References
 Nussbaum, Louis Frédéric and Käthe Roth. (2005). Japan Encyclopedia. Cambridge: Harvard University Press. ; OCLC 48943301
 Screech, Timon. (2006). Secret Memoirs of the Shoguns: Isaac Titsingh and Japan, 1779-1822. London: RoutledgeCurzon. ; OCLC 65177072
 Titsingh, Isaac. (1834). Nihon Odai Ichiran; ou,  Annales des empereurs du Japon.  Paris: Royal Asiatic Society, Oriental Translation Fund of Great Britain and Ireland. OCLC 5850691.

External links 
 National Diet Library, "The Japanese Calendar" -- historical overview plus illustrative images from library's collection

Japanese eras
1710s in Japan